Rui Jorge Faria Azevedo (born 9 December 1980), known as Faria, is a Portuguese former footballer who played as a goalkeeper.

He spent most of his professional career with Aves.

Club career
Born in Guimarães, Faria joined C.D. Aves' youth system in early 1997. He made his senior debut with amateurs G.D. Serzedelo in his native region, returning after one season on loan in the fourth division.

After being used intermittently, Faria became the undisputed starter in 2004, helping to promotion to the Primeira Liga two years later after an absence of more than two decades. He made his debut in the competition on 26 August 2006 in a 2–2 away draw against S.C. Beira-Mar, and kept his starting place until the following January transfer window, when he lost it to veteran Nuno Espírito Santo.

Faria suffered a season-ending injury in April 2007, as Aves were finally relegated as last. He appeared in a further 84 Segunda Liga matches until his departure from the club, in June 2015.

References

External links

1980 births
Living people
Sportspeople from Guimarães
Portuguese footballers
Association football goalkeepers
Primeira Liga players
Liga Portugal 2 players
Campeonato de Portugal (league) players
C.D. Aves players
G.D. Serzedelo players
F.C. Tirsense players
AD Oliveirense players
AD Fafe players